Moorkanad, or Moorkkanad, is a village in malappuram, Kerala, India. Moorkkanad is presently gram panchayath in mankada constituency.Moorkanad panchayath is a larger village [kolathur,vengad,moorkkanad]]. Kunthi river flows through Moorkkanad.

Notable sites 

Notable sites in the village include:
  A local landmark, the Siva temple, which is 1500years old and is one of the few Siva temples in Kerala.
 The Cheriyil Bhagavathi temple, which comes under the Cheriyil Nair Kudumbakshema trust
 The local Roman Catholic Saint Antony's Church.
 The local, and only, school is St. Antony's High School, which comes under the Catholic Diocese of Irinjalakuda.

Access and amenities 

Moorkkanad is accessible from Karuvannur Valiyapalam and from Karuvannur puthan thode. It is 1.5 km from Valiyapalam and 2 km from Puthenthode. Many buses run from Trichur and Irinjalakuda via Moorkkanad which go to Katoor, Karalam, Edamuttam and Triprayar.

The village has a high literacy rate and there is a strong emphasis on education and healthcare, which contributes to the reputation of the area. Moorkkand has a primary health centre and two anganvadis (play schools/pre-schools), which are administered by the Government of Kerala. The village also has an art and sports club named Kerala Athletic Club and a village library named Grammeena Vayanasala, both more than 50 years old.

Moorkkanad has a branch post office, which comes under the Karuvanoor main post office. Its postal code is 680711. There is a BSNL rural telephone exchange.

Water 

Moorkkanad Illikkal Sluice is on the Karuvannur River. The shutters of this sluice help to hold back water, which is used for the irrigation of paddyfields in the Kole wetlands in the adjoining areas during the period from December to May. Hidayathul Islam Madrasa is near to the Illikkal Dam, as is a water pumping station.

References

Villages in Thrissur district